Sunranwala is a small village in the Kapurthala District of Punjab State, India. It is situated 13 km away from Kapurthala which is both district and sub-district headquarter of Sunranwala. The village code of Sunranwala is 029305 and the total geographical area is 308 hectares. The village is administrated by Sarpanch who is the elected representative of village.

References

Villages in Kapurthala district